William Anthony "Bill" Dotzler Jr. (born May 7, 1948) is the Iowa State Senator from the 31st District. A Democrat, he has served in the Iowa Senate since 2003 and previously served as assistant majority leader.

Early life and education

Dotzler went to Cedar Falls High School graduating in 1966.  He then went on to receive his A.A. from North Iowa Area Community College in 1969.  Dotzler then served in the United States Army Office of Military Intelligence for three years, serving one tour in Germany.  Upon returning, Dotzler enrolled in the University of Northern Iowa receiving his B.A. in Biology in 1975.

Iowa House and Senate

Dotzler had previously been a member of the Iowa House of Representatives, representing the 26th District from 1997 to 2003, and then was elected to the Iowa Senate in 2003 succeeding John Jensen.

Dotzler was re-elected in 2006 with 11,782 votes (70%), defeating Republican opponent Jim Buschkamp. 

In 2007, Dotzler was instrumental in helping to pass tax incentives aimed at technology companies such as Google and Microsoft to build a facility in Iowa and invest millions of dollars in the state.  The legislation gave companies tax breaks on sales tax from utility bills as well as property tax breaks. 

Dotzler was re-elected in 2010 with 10,459 votes (59%), defeating Republican opponent Ron Welper. 

More recently Dotzler has gone on record opposing the construction of new nuclear power plants in Iowa citing cost and safety concerns. 

Dotzler currently serves on several committees in the Iowa Senate - the Appropriations committee; the Economic Growth committee; the Human Resources committee; the Labor and Business Relations committee; and the Ways and Means committee.  He also serves as chair of the Economic Development Appropriations Subcommittee.

References

External links
Senator William A. Dotzler Jr. official Iowa Legislature site
Senator William A. Dotzler Jr. official Iowa General Assembly site
State Senator Bill Dotzler official constituency site
 

Living people
Democratic Party Iowa state senators
Democratic Party members of the Iowa House of Representatives
University of Northern Iowa alumni
Politicians from Saint Paul, Minnesota
Politicians from Waterloo, Iowa
1948 births
21st-century American politicians